Wilbor may refer to any one of the following:

Edward G. Wilbor (1807–1869), New York politician
Wilbor House, in Little Compton, Rhode Island
The Wilbor House, in Chatham, New York
Silvanus wilbore

See also
Wilber (disambiguation)
Wilbour (disambiguation)
Wilbur (disambiguation)